The 2022 Saarland state election was held on 27 March 2022 to elect the 17th Landtag of Saarland. The outgoing government was a coalition of the Christian Democratic Union (CDU) and Social Democratic Party (SPD) led by Minister-President Tobias Hans.

The election was won by the SPD in an historic landslide, capturing a majority in the Landtag and winning at least a plurality in all municipalities of Saarland, largely attributed to the personal popularity of longtime Deputy Minister-President Anke Rehlinger. This election was the first time since the 2017 North Rhine-Westphalia state election that an incumbent Minister-President was defeated for re-election, with the largest margin of defeat since the 2011 Hamburg state election, the first time since the 2013 Bavarian state election that a party received an absolute majority in a Landtag, as well as the first time since 1994 that the SPD did so in the Saarland.

Overall, the SPD won 43.5% of votes to the CDU's 28.5%, a swing of fifteen percentage points between them. The Left lost all their seats after suffering a decline of ten points. The Alternative for Germany became the only minor party in the Landtag with just under 6%, while the The Greens fell just 23 votes short of the 5% electoral threshold to win seats. The Free Democratic Party also failed to enter the Landtag with 4.8%. A total of 22.3% of votes did not translate into seats due to the electoral threshold, a record high in any state election.

Election date
The Landtag is elected for five years, with its term commencing when the new Landtag first meets. As the previous election took place on 26 March 2017, the next election was required to take place before April 2022.

Electoral system
The 51 members of the Landtag are elected via closed list proportional representation using the d'Hondt method. 41 seats are distributed in three multi-member constituencies, and the remaining ten at the state level. An electoral threshold of 5% of valid votes is applied to the Landtag; parties that fall below this threshold are ineligible to receive seats.

Background

In the previous election held on 26 March 2017, the CDU remained the largest party with 40.7% of votes cast, an increase of 5.5 percentage points. The SPD declined slightly to 29.6%. The Left fell to 12.8%, a decline of 3.3 points. Alternative for Germany (AfD) contested its first election in Saarland, winning 6.2%. The Greens lost their representation in the Landtag with a result of 4.0%. 

The CDU had led a grand coalition with the SPD since 2012 under Minister-President Annegret Kramp-Karrenbauer, which was renewed after the election. Kramp-Karrenbauer resigned as Minister-President after her, ultimately unsuccessful, entry into federal politics in February 2018, and was succeeded by Tobias Hans as Minister-President in March and as state CDU leader in October 2018.

Even though the Saarland is the second smallest state by population and does not represent Germany as a whole demographically, the election proved to be of pivotal importance to the following state elections and in particular the federal election later that year. New SPD lead candidate Martin Schulz led the party to a resurgence nationally in early 2017, and polls showed the SPD within striking distance of winning in Saarland. However, the clear CDU victory marked the beginning of a decline on both the federal level and in other states. This resulted in heavy losses for the SPD in Schleswig-Holstein, in North Rhine-Westphalia and, ultimately, in the 2017 German federal election. Similarly, the 2022 election was seen as a test both for the ruling Scholz cabinet and new CDU leader Friedrich Merz, and would set the tone for several more state elections throughout the year.

Until July 2021, the CDU had a solid lead in opinion polling. However, following the decline of the CDU on the federal level, the SPD surged ahead, cemented by the personal popularity of longtime Deputy Minister-President Anke Rehlinger.

Parties
The table below lists parties represented in the 16th Landtag of Saarland.

In addition to the parties already represented in the Landtag, fourteen parties collected enough signatures to be placed on the ballot.

Alliance 90/The Greens (GRÜNE)
Free Democratic Party (FDP)
Family Party of Germany (FAMILIE)
Pirate Party Germany (PIRATEN)
Free Voters (FREIE WÄHLER)
Grassroots Democratic Party of Germany (dieBasis)
Bunt.saar – social-ecological list (Bunt.saar)
Ecological Democratic Party (ÖDP)
The Humanists (Die Humanisten)
Die PARTEI (DIE PARTEI)
Party for Health Research (Gesundheitsforschung)
Human Environment Animal Protection (Tierschutzpartei)
SGV – Solidarity, Justice, Change (SGV)
Volt Germany (Volt)

Lead candidates

The Left
Since at least 2017, the Saarland branch of The Left was embroiled into a dispute between Thomas Lutze, state treasurer from 2013 to 2017 and chairman since 2019, and Oskar Lafontaine, parliamentary leader since 2009. Lutze was accused of manipulating internal party elections by forging documents and fraudulently paying membership dues. Public audits from 2017 to 2020 and a federal review in 2021 provided no evidence of irregularities. The Saarbrücken public prosecutor's office began an investigation into Lutze in March 2021, but the case was dropped in January 2022.

In May 2021, the state executive requested that Lafontaine and former state chairwoman Astrid Schramm resign from the party, accusing them of being "the driving force behind the internal mudslinging that has been going on for years at the party's expense". They refused. After the federal election in September, Lafontaine announced that he would not seek re-election to the Landtag in the upcoming state election.

On 2 November 2021, deputy state chairwoman Barbara Spaniol was expelled from the Left parliamentary faction, accused of "supporting the public attacks by the state chairman against the Left faction". On 10 November, she founded the Saar-Linke parliamentary group with Dagmar Ensch-Engel, who had previously resigned from the Left faction in 2018 after facing pressure from the Lafontaine camp. On 21 November, Spaniol was elected as The Left's lead candidate for the state election, winning 85.1% support.

AfD
In January 2022, the Alternative for Germany's state list was withdrawn by the party trustees shortly before the deadline for candidate submissions passed. Two members of the party's state executive had arbitrarily switched out the trustees, who then withdrew the list. State chairman Christian Wirth alleged that the four members involved did not support the proposed lead candidate Kai Melling. The party still competed in all three regional constituencies, which together provided 41 of the 51 members of the Landtag. However, due to the lack of a state list, the AfD was without a lead candidate.

Greens
At the Alliance 90/The Greens state congress on 7 January 2022, Lisa Becker was elected as lead candidate for the state election. She was one of three candidates alongside state chairwoman Uta Sullenberger and Kiymet Goektas; the former withdrew before the ballot and Becker defeated Goektas with 110 votes to 80.

FDP
Angelika Hießerich-Peter was elected as the FDP's lead candidate for the election, winning 79% of votes at a party congress.

Opinion polling

Graphical summary

Party polling

Minister-President polling

Party competences

Results

Aftermath
Minister-President Tobias Hans conceded defeat on the evening of the election and claimed responsibility for the result. Due to her party securing an absolute majority, Anke Rehlinger expressed her intent to govern without a coalition.

Rehlinger was elected as Minister-President by the Landtag on 25 April, winning 32 votes out of 51 cast.

References

Elections in Saarland
2022 elections in Germany